Marcelo Chávez (13 March 1911 – 14 February 1970) was a Mexican film actor. He frequently co-starred with comedian Germán Valdés, known as Tin Tan.

Selected filmography
 Summer Hotel (1944)
The Disobedient Son (1945)
 The Noiseless Dead (1946)
 Music Inside (1947)
 The Lost Child (1947)
 Music, Poetry and Madness (1948)
 Rough But Respectable (1949)
 Tender Pumpkins (1949)
 The King of the Neighborhood (1950)
 The Mark of the Fox (1950)
 Sinbad the Seasick (1950)
 Oh Darling! Look What You've Done! (1951)
When Women Rule (1951)
 Kill Me Because I'm Dying! (1951)
 The Beautiful Dreamer (1952)
 Snow White (1952)
 Chucho the Mended (1952)
 You've Got Me By the Wing (1953)
 The Island of Women (1953)
 The Unknown Mariachi (1953)
 The Vagabond (1953)
 The Viscount of Monte Cristo (1954)
 Look What Happened to Samson (1955)
 Bluebeard (1955)
 Barefoot Sultan (1956)
 Puss Without Boots (1957)
 The Phantom of the Operetta (1960)
 Rebel Without a House (1960)

References

Bibliography 
 Scott L. Baugh. Latino American Cinema: An Encyclopedia of Movies, Stars, Concepts, and Trends: An Encyclopedia of Movies, Stars, Concepts, and Trends. ABC-CLIO, 2012.

External links 
 

1911 births
1970 deaths
Mexican male film actors